Madras Light Cavalry may refer to:

 1st Madras Light Cavalry or 8th King George's Own Light Cavalry
 2nd Madras Light Cavalry, or 16th Light Cavalry
 3rd Madras Light Cavalry, 7th Light Cavalry
 4th Madras Light Cavalry; see Madras Army
 5th Madras Light Cavalry; see Madras Army
 6th Madras Light Cavalry; see Madras Army
 7th Madras Light Cavalry; see Madras Army
 8th Madras Light Cavalry; see Madras Army

See also
Madras (disambiguation)
Cavalry (disambiguation)
Madras Army
Light cavalry